Juan Carlos Chávez Zárate (born 18 January 1967) is a Mexican former footballer who played at both professional and international levels as a midfielder.

Career
Born in Zamora, Michoacán, Chávez played club football for Atlas, Puebla, Monarcas Morelia and Pachuca.

Chávez also earned three caps for the Mexico national team, representing them at the 1994 FIFA World Cup.

After he retired from playing, Chávez became a football coach. He led the Mexico national under-20 football team at the 2011 FIFA U-20 World Cup finals in Colombia, and was appointed manager of Club Atlas in September 2011.

References

External links

1967 births
Living people
People from Zamora, Michoacán
Footballers from Michoacán
Association football midfielders
Mexican footballers
Mexico international footballers
1994 FIFA World Cup players
Atlas F.C. footballers
Club Puebla players
Atlético Morelia players
C.F. Pachuca players
Mexican football managers
Atlas F.C. managers
1993 CONCACAF Gold Cup players